= Sebidae =

Scientific classification
- Kingdom: Animalia
- Phylum: Arthropoda
- Clade: Pancrustacea
- Class: Malacostraca
- Order: Amphipoda
- Parvorder: Amphilochidira
- Superfamily: Amphilochoidea
- Family: Sebidae; Walker, 1908

Genera
- See text

Family of crustaceans

Figure 1; Seba longimera

Sebidae is a family of amphipods. Its members are disjunctly distributed, occurring in the Mediterranean Sea, eastern and southern parts of the Atlantic Ocean, the southern United States, the Hawaiian Islands, the Indian Ocean, Antarctica and Australia.

- Caribseba
- Seba
- Seborgia
